Paul McQuade (born 17 May 1987 in Kirkcaldy) is a Scottish footballer who plays as a striker.

Career

Raith Rovers

McQuade started his professional career at Raith Rovers but never made a reserve team appearance. He was released at the end of the 2004/05 season and had a spell playing Junior football with Dundonald Bluebell.

Cowdenbeath

McQuade was signed by Cowdenbeath after scoring a double against them and impressing in a friendly while playing for Dundonald Bluebell. During his time with the Blue Brazil he scored 29 goals in 85 appearances across all competitions.

St Mirren

In June 2010 McQuade joined St Mirren on a two-year contract, joining up with former manager Danny Lennon.

Forfar Athletic

In March 2011, McQuade joined Forfar Athletic on an emergency loan transfer until the end of the season.

East Fife

In August 2011, McQuade was freed by St Mirren and joined East Fife for a season. During his spell with the Fifers he made only 16 Appearances.

References

External links 

1987 births
Living people
Scottish footballers
Footballers from Kirkcaldy
Dundonald Bluebell F.C. players
Raith Rovers F.C. players
Cowdenbeath F.C. players
St Mirren F.C. players
Forfar Athletic F.C. players
East Fife F.C. players
Broxburn Athletic F.C. players
Linlithgow Rose F.C. players
St Andrews United F.C. players
Association football forwards
Scottish Football League players